The Hong Kong Housing Society or Housing Society for short, is the second largest public housing provider in Hong Kong (the first being the Hong Kong Housing Authority). The Society housed around 130,000 residents as of 2020. The Housing Society has been a dedicated housing provider in constantly identifying the housing needs of different sectors of the community and developing housing options attuned to their needs. Since its inception, a total of over 73,000 units have been built under different housing schemes, including Rental Estate, Rural Public Housing, Urban Improvement Scheme, Flat-for-Sale Scheme, Sandwich Class Housing Scheme, Full Market Value Development, Urban Renewal Project, Senior Citizen Residences Scheme, The Tanner Hill and Subsidised Sale Flats project.

The society is a non-governmental organisation and non-profit organisation.
The Chairman of the society is Walter Chan and the Chief Executive Officer and Executive Director is Chan Yum-min.

History

After the end of World War II in 1945, Hong Kong was devastated and traumatised in the post-war aftermath. There was material deprivation and a shortage of housing. Due to the incessant crises in the political arena of the Chinese mainland, vast numbers of mainland refugees flocked to Hong Kong. They built huts and settled themselves on unoccupied hillsides, which worsened the already severe housing problem. At that time, Hong Kong had not yet devised any public housing policy, not to mention any departments to steer the planning and building of public housing.

In 1947, The Lord Mayor of London donated a sum of 14,000 pounds from its Air Raid Distress Fund to the Hong Kong Social Welfare Council. A member of the Council and the Anglican Bishop of Hong Kong, the Reverend RO Hall, took the lead to use the donation to launch a housing organisation for mitigating Hong Kong’s serious housing problems. Bishop Hall, together with a group of social leaders, established a committee which held its first meeting on 17 April 1948. HKHS was formally established in 1951 as a statutory body under Hong Kong Ordinance Chapter 1059. It was the first-ever independent statutory body in Hong Kong that undertook public housing affairs.

In 1952, the first rental housing estate in Hong Kong, Sheung Li Uk, was completed in Sham Shui Po, providing 5 blocks with 360 residential units and accommodating 1,900 tenants. To break out from the communal design which prevailed at that time, Sheung Li Uk provided self-contained flats with kitchens, bathrooms and balconies. Moreover, it was better planned and managed with the provision of community centres, public open spaces and basic play equipment for children, which became a prototype for future public housing.

From then on, HKHS has been launching various housing schemes and services to address the changing needs of the community.

Property Development
Rental Estates
Rural public housing
Urban Improvement Scheme
Flat-for-Sale Scheme
Sandwich Class Housing Scheme
Full Market Value Development
Urban Renewal Project
Senior Citizen Residences Scheme
The Tanner Hill
Subsidised Sale Flats project.

Business
Property development
Housing Society Elderly Resources Centre
Property Management and Commercial Leasing
Loan services
Building Management and Maintenance Scheme
Hong Kong Housing Society Academy

See also
Joyous Living senior housing project
Hong Kong Housing Authority
List of public housing estates in Hong Kong

References

External links

Hong Kong Housing Society 
Housing, Planning & Lands Bureau
Urban Renewal Authority
Housing Authority and Housing Department
 

1948 establishments in Hong Kong
Public housing in Hong Kong
Hong Kong government departments and agencies
Statutory bodies in Hong Kong